Haptogenys bipunctata is a species of combtooth blenny found in the western Pacific and Indian Oceans. It is the only known member of its genus.

References

Blenniinae
Taxa named by Victor G. Springer
Fish described in 1876
Monotypic marine fish genera
Monotypic ray-finned fish genera